Royal Valley High School is a public secondary school in Hoyt, Kansas, United States, and operated by Royal Valley USD 337 school district.

Sports
The school colors are purple and white, and the mascot is the Panther. It is a part of the Big 7 League.

Royal Valley is home of the 1974 Boys 2A State Cross Country Champions, the 2019 Girls 3A State Basketball Champions, and the 2019 3A State Volleyball Champions.

See also
 List of high schools in Kansas
 List of unified school districts in Kansas

External links
 Royal Valley High School
 Royal Valley Schools USD 337

Educational institutions in the United States with year of establishment missing
Public high schools in Kansas
Schools in Jackson County, Kansas